Saraswati Hembram was an Indian politician. She was elected to the Odisha Legislative Assembly as a member of the Indian National Congress.

References

Indian National Congress politicians
Biju Janata Dal politicians
Women in Odisha politics
Odisha MLAs 1995–2000
Odisha MLAs 1985–1990
Odisha MLAs 1980–1985
21st-century Indian women politicians